The 1909 Lehigh Brown and White football team was an American football team represented Lehigh University as an independent during the 1909 college football season. The team compiled a 4–3–2 record. Byron W. Dickson was the head coach.

Schedule

References

Lehigh
Lehigh Mountain Hawks football seasons
Lehigh football